Platysphinx is a genus of moths in the family Sphingidae first described by Walter Rothschild and Karl Jordan in 1903.

Species
Platysphinx bouyeri Haxaire & Bompar 2004
Platysphinx constrigilis (Walker 1869)
Platysphinx dorsti Rougeot 1977
Platysphinx phyllis Rothschild & Jordan 1903
Platysphinx piabilis (Distant 1897)
Platysphinx stigmatica (Mabille 1878)
Platysphinx vicaria Jordan 1920
Platysphinx zabolichus Haxaire & Melichar 2007

References

 
Smerinthini
Moth genera
Taxa named by Walter Rothschild
Taxa named by Karl Jordan